Capitol Centre (previously: Capitol Exchange Centre) is an indoor shopping centre in the city of Cardiff, Wales. Functioning as one of the city's retail malls,  The building is built on the site of the former Capitol Theatre, and is situated at the eastern end of Queen Street near the Dumfries Place bus terminus and Cardiff Queen Street railway station.

It was anchored by a large H&M store, with the front of the centre being dominated by Tesco since Virgin Megastores and Zavvi ceased operations in 2009.

History

The Capitol Centre was opened in 1990, with attempts to replicate the original architecture. Ceramic tiles from the previous Victorian Dutch Cafe tearooms were incorporated on the eastern exterior. The style of build dated very quickly and, in 1999, the centre underwent a £10 million redevelopment, which included the refurbishment of the pedestrian areas, the removal of the food court and new entrances into the centre (although much of the original external facade still remains). It was completed in November 1999.

There were plans to develop 164 apartments, plus retail and commercial space and additional car parking facilities at the corner of North Edward Street and Station Terrace.  This would provide 50 per cent additional spaces, bringing the total car parking spaces up to 632. The scheme architects, Dobson Architects, expected it could be completed by 2012, but this never happened.

In 2015 Capitol Centre was bought by new owner NewRiver Retail.

In 2022 plans were revealed to create a new 14,500 sq ft food court in attempts to revive the centre's fortunes.

Cinema
The centre had originally also housed a five-screen Odeon cinema up until 2001, it has reopened in April 2015 operated by Premiere Cinemas. In October 2022, It was announced that Premiere Cinemas has now closed its doors for the final time, amid a new development that is currently under construction just below the JobCentre Plus (formerly H&M Retail). No release date has been published on this new development as of yet.

See also
List of shopping arcades in Cardiff

References

External links
 
Capitol Centre official site

Economy of Cardiff
Shopping arcades in Cardiff
Castle, Cardiff
1990 establishments in Wales
Commercial buildings completed in 1990